Princess Charlotte Amalie of Denmark and Norway (6 October 1706 – 28 October 1782) was a Danish princess, daughter of King Frederick IV of Denmark and Louise of Mecklenburg-Güstrow.

Life 

Charlotte Amalie never married. In 1725, she was placed on the list of 99 princesses regarded as suitable for marriage with Louis XV of France (which would require that she convert to Catholicism), but she was removed from the list because Denmark-Norway was an arch enemy toward Sweden, the traditional ally of France, and that such a marriage could potentially disturb the French-Swedish alliance.    In the early 1730s, her brother the king tried to arrange a marriage between her and Frederick, Prince of Wales, but the negotiations did not succeed and she remained unmarried.

As was the custom for unmarried princesses, she lived with her mother until her mother's death, and then with her stepmother. In contrast to her brother and sister-in-law, she had a good relationship with her stepmother, Anna Sophie Reventlow.  Charlotte Amalie tried to prevent the worst hostility toward her stepmother at court. She was separated from Anna Sophie when her brother succeeded to the throne in 1730. After this, she lived at the royal court in winters, and at Charlottenlund Palace in summer with her own court.

Charlotte Amalie was described by her contemporaries as a lovable character with the ability to keep the peace with most: she had a good relationship with her father and stepmother, and still managed to have a good relationship also with her brother, who hated his own father and stepmother. She had no influence upon the affairs of state, and lived a peaceful life at court her entire life.

On 8 April 1771, she was ordered to leave court. She spent the rest of her life with her nephew's widow, the queen dowager Juliana Maria. This meant that she continued to spend much of her time at court, when the queen dowager attended it: Juliana Maria became de facto regent in 1772.  
As she preferred black wigs, she had ordered her staff to wear them, and her court became known as "The court of the black wigs". After 1778, she no longer showed herself to the public, as she had become senile.

Charlotte Amalie is known as the benefactress of the writer Charlotte Baden, who was the niece of one of her chief ladies-in-waiting, Anna Susanne von der Osten. Baden was raised at her court, and Charlotte Amalie provided her with an education and an allowance. In her will from 1773, Charlotte Amalie created a foundation, Prinsesse C.A.s stiftelse, to finance the upbringing of poor girls of all classes.

Legacy
Charlottenlund Palace, where she spent her summers, was built and named after her in 1731–1733.

Ancestry

References 

 Dansk biografisk Lexikon / III. Bind. Brandt - Clavus 1889
 Dansk Biografisk Leksikon, 1979-84.
 https://web.archive.org/web/20110609124413/http://www.ses.dk/en/SlotteOgHaver/Slotte/CharlottenlundSlotOgSlotshave/CharlottenlundSlot.aspx
  (search for all versions on WorldCat)

External links 

1782 deaths
1706 births
Danish princesses
Norwegian princesses
Charlotte Amalie of Denmark
Burials at Roskilde Cathedral
Daughters of kings